The National Hospital is a hospital in Niamey, Niger. It has 244 beds. The hospital was founded in 1922.

Services 
The hospital provides a wide range of services to residents of Niamey and the greater region. As of September, 2018 the National Hospital has two Otolaryngologists, two Ophthalmologists, five Radiologists, three Cardiologists, three Dermatologists, four Obsetricians/Gynecologists, five dentists and one psychiatrist.

References

Hospitals in Niger
Buildings and structures in Niamey